Waterstones, formerly Waterstone's, is a British book retailer that operates 311 shops, mainly in the United Kingdom and also other nearby countries. As of February 2014, it employs around 3,500 staff in the UK and Europe. An average-sized Waterstones shop sells a range of approximately 30,000 individual books, as well as stationery and other related products.

Established in 1982 by Tim Waterstone, after whom the company was named, the bookseller expanded rapidly until being sold in 1993 to WHSmith. In 1998, Waterstones was bought by a consortium of Waterstone, EMI and Advent International. The company was taken under the umbrella of HMV Group, which later merged the Dillons and Ottakar's brands into the company. Following several poor sets of results for the group, HMV put the chain up for sale. In May 2011, it was announced that A&NN Capital Fund Management, owned by Russian billionaire Alexander Mamut, had bought the chain for £53.5m and appointed James Daunt as managing director. The company is incorporated in England and Wales as Waterstones Booksellers Ltd, with its registered office at 203–206 Piccadilly, London (which is also the location of its flagship shop). As well as the Waterstones brand, the company owns the London bookseller Hatchards, Irish shop Hodges Figgis, and reached an agreement to purchase Foyles in 2018. In April 2018, hedge fund Elliott Management Corporation bought a majority stake in the company.

The bookseller has concession agreements with Paperchase and previously with coffee chains Costa Coffee and Starbucks in some shops, but since 2012 has introduced its own Café W brand.  For a time, Waterstones sold eReaders, including in 2012 partnering with Amazon to sell the Amazon Kindle, but has since pulled out of this market for commercial reasons.

Waterstones administers and supports various literary awards, including the Children's Laureate award and the Waterstones Children's Book Prize.

History and developments

Formation & WHSmith: 1982–1998

The chain was founded by Tim Waterstone after he took a £6,000 redundancy payout from WHSmith. He set up his first shop in Old Brompton Road, Kensington with the ambition of creating a 'different breed of bookshop', using techniques he had seen in the United States. He used literary authors in front of shop displays and employed highly literate staff.

The model proved successful and the chain set about expanding its shop portfolio. In 1990 WHSmith took a strong minority stake in the chain, and ten years after its birth, by 1992, Waterstone's had grown to be the largest bookseller group in Europe.  WHSmith  then acquired the company in 1993 at an enterprise value of £47m, paying £5.27 a share on 8.1m 10p shares, a 53x multiple for the early stage investors. Under WHSmith, Waterstones pursued international expansion, opening its first US shop in Boston in 1991, as well as further domestic expansion – opening its 100th UK shop in a former chapel in Reading.

The chain was part of the eventual dismantling of the Net Book Agreement, when in 1991, following a promotion by then rivals Dillons, the company decided to pursue its own discounting promotion on selected titles. By 1997, the agreement had collapsed and been declared illegal.

HMV Group: 1998–2011

Following an attempt by Tim Waterstone in 1997 to buy the entire WHSmith group, WHSmith sold the Waterstones chain for £300 million to HMV Media plc (now HMV Group) – a joint venture between EMI, Advent International and Tim Waterstone. This included high street brands HMV and rival Dillons, creating an international entertainment retailer. Waterstone was appointed chairman of the group but stood down in 2001, citing "concerns for the way the company was being run"   and was replaced by Alan Giles. A year later, all Dillons shops were rebranded as Waterstones, with some sold to rival Ottakar's making the brand defunct. The chain had also begun pulling out of its US overseas venture.

Waterstones launched the Waterstones Books Quarterly magazine in 2001, containing book reviews and author interviews. In the same year the booksellers' online operation, Waterstones.co.uk, was franchised to Amazon.com, with the company expressing a desire "to concentrate on its high street and campus shops". The move resulted in the loss of 50 jobs. In 2003, Waterstones announced it was supporting Dyslexia Action as its chosen charity, helping to raise awareness and understanding for dyslexia.

In 2006 Giles stepped down from his position and was replaced by Gerry Johnson as managing director of Waterstones and Simon Fox as group CEO. In April 2006 following two bids by Permira for the group, Tim Waterstone attempted to buy back the company from HMV for £256 million, but later withdrew his offer specifying the conditions set by HMV were "too punitive" to accept. A strategic review in September saw Waterstones pull out of its franchise agreement with Amazon to re-launch its online business, Waterstones.com, independently. The chain also began to pilot a loyalty programme in South West England and Wales. The scheme was successful, launching nationally as The Waterstones Card across its entire shop portfolio.

Waterstones piloted a brand refresh exercise in selected shops, beginning with Manchester's Arndale Centre in 2007. On 19 November 2007, the chain closed its first branch on Old Brompton Road. Following a consultation, the company's supply chain was overhauled in 2008 with the implementation of a  warehouse and distribution centre in Burton-upon-Trent. Existing direct-to-store deliveries from suppliers were replaced by a centralised warehouse capable of receiving merchandise and sorting an estimated 70 million books per year and 200 staff were made redundant by the process. In September 2008, Waterstones began selling the Sony Reader in an agreement which saw the booksellers' branches and Sony Centre shops stock the reader exclusively for two weeks after its release. Waterstones.com began to supply eBooks in the .epub format. In November 2009, Waterstones moved into second-hand bookselling in a partnership with Alibris setting up an online reselling tool called Waterstones Marketplace, part of Waterstones.com.

In January 2010, HMV Group announced that Waterstones like-for-like sales over the Christmas period were down 8.5 per cent on the previous year. This culminated in the resignation of managing director Gerry Johnson with immediate effect. He was replaced by development director Dominic Myers, who was managing director of the British academic bookselling chain Blackwells until 2005. Myers joined HMV in 2006 to oversee the integration of Ottakar's into the chain. In response to the decline in sales, he implemented a three-year plan in which branches were tailored to their local market alongside a 'rejuvenation' of the company brand and an increase in range. As part of these changes, Waterstones implemented new branding in May 2010, developed by agency VentureThree. The company also moved to support the Rainbow Trust, which provides support to children with life-threatening and terminal illnesses and their families, in the same year.

After an announcement that profits would be at the lower end of analysts' forecasts due to falling sales and a share price fall of 20%, HMV Group indicated its intention to close a number of Waterstones branches in January 2011. These shop closures, including two in Dublin, Republic of Ireland and nine others across the United Kingdom occurred in February 2011. Further branch closures in Luton, Dorking, Lancaster University, Harrods, Gateshead and Norwich Arcade were completed by the end of 2011.

Alexander Mamut & James Daunt: 2011–present

In May 2011 HMV Group announced the sale of Waterstones to A&NN Capital Fund Management, a fund controlled by Russian businessman Alexander Mamut for £53 million. The takeover was welcomed by publishers as "a step forward to re-establishing a proper physical presence". On 29 June 2011, the sale of Waterstones was completed and approved by the vast majority of shareholders at an emergency general meeting. Mamut appointed James Daunt, founder of Daunt Books, as managing director and a board of directors was announced in October 2011 including Miranda Curtis as chairman. In September 2011, the bookseller announced that it intended to drop its 3-for-2 deal on books after a decade. The offer was replaced with a 'bespoke offer', based on branches choosing their own pricing structures from available discounts.

In January 2012, the company announced that it would be moving away from the branding developed in 2010 by agency VentureThree, and reverting to its original logo. This involved the removal of the apostrophe from its name because, James Daunt argued, "Waterstones without an apostrophe is, in a digital world of URLs and email addresses, a more versatile and practical spelling". This decision received media coverage, in which the company was subject to criticism. John Richards, of the Apostrophe Protection Society, said that the change was "just plain wrong" and "grammatically incorrect" while the move sparked outrage on Twitter, involving debate on whether the move was grammatically incorrect or not. Linguist David Crystal on his blog added: " ... if Waterstone's wants to become Waterstones, that's up to the firm. It's nothing to do with expressing possession or plurality or anything to do with meaning."

In the same month, Waterstones confirmed plans to open a Russian language bookshop in its Piccadilly branch, intending to stock 5000 titles with the shop being entirely staffed of Russian-speaking booksellers. The concession, named The Russian Bookshop, opened in March 2012.

Following a decision in late-2011 to scrap an e-reading offer in-branch, it was announced in May 2012 that Waterstones would be selling the Amazon Kindle across its estate. James Daunt launched the new agreement with Amazon stating that Waterstones would be offering "e-reading services and offer Kindle digital devices" throughout the company's branches and on its website, with an intention to "make the Kindle experience better". This announcement was received with surprise across the book industry as it had been suggested that Waterstones was developing a partnership with Barnes & Noble to launch the Nook in the UK, or that the company was developing its own device, but Daunt "ultimately rejected" other avenues as Waterstones "would have been out of the market" before their implementation.

It was also announced in May 2012 that the company would begin a refurbishment plan, with Mamut "investing tens of millions of pounds" to fund the refit of a planned 100 shops before the end of the year. The plan saw the introduction of wi-fi into shops, reorganisation of shop sections and space dedicated areas for Kindle devices, and a number of own-brand coffee shops called Café W. The Café W brand was trialled in the Sutton branch, with an expressed aim for around 130 shops over a 3-year period to be fitted with a café. The announcement also noted the introduction of a 'click-and-collect' service.

The Amazon Kindle officially launched in-branch in October 2012 with an "outdoor and press advertising campaign" promoting the launch, with the Kindle Fire and Kindle Paperwhite model going on sale for the first time in the UK along with older models. The Kindles were tailored with Waterstones screensavers, which led to some complaints and customers attempting to return their devices. The release of the Kindle coincided with a relaunch of the company's brand in the same month, pushing the message that the chain was the 'nation's leading bookshop' and producing an exclusive anthology, the Waterstones Red Anthology, to help promote the shops.

By the end of 2012, the Waterstones estate had shrunk to 288 shops, with "commercial reasons" given for the closure of branches in Bromsgrove, Stevenage, Watford, Fleet Street, High Holborn and Epsom among others, with staff being redeployed where possible. In 2012, Daunt stated that future expansion was being considered, based on the performance of the company. The accounts for the year to 2012 showed Waterstones, prior- and post-acquisition had made losses of £37.3 million Started in 2012 was an overhaul of the company's business strategy, with centralised decision making giving way to shop-based decisions and a renewed emphasis on traditional bookselling techniques. Waterstones embarked on a major restructuring of staffing levels, with a company-wide consultation with 560 managerial staff to subsequently reduce roles within the company. This consultation led to Head Office staff departures and around 200 branch and regional managers leaving their posts. Waterstones launched a number of new partnerships through the year, including with the University of Derby to launch a professional qualification programme for its staff, with the Folio Society to extend customer reach and stock selection in London-based bookshops, and partnering with a new charity, BookTrust. By the end of 2013, Waterstones had cut its losses to £12.2 million, opened 12 further Café W outlets, and embarked on a capital investment in its shop portfolio of £29.5 million.
In 2014, the opened new shops in Ringwood, Blackburn and Southwold, its first branch to be without Waterstones branding, as well as closing shops in Eastleigh and St Neots. Continued business strategy change saw further departures from head office in brand communication and PR and a renewed agency contract for Waterstones' digital marketing with Epiphany. The retailer overhauled its business technology with new algorithms on its website to help personalise the online shopping experience, updated point-of-sale IT and by introducing contactless payment in its shops. The retailer partnered with Airbnb to hold a one-off ‘sleepover’ for customers in its Piccadilly branch in October 2014 after a customer was accidentally trapped in the Trafalgar Square branch after closing. Accounts for 2014 saw operating income losses narrow to £3.8 million, but sales slip by 5.9%.

The ongoing strategic changes made to the way the business operates included the decision in October 2015, after 3 years on sale in shops, to remove the Kindle from its offer following "pitiful" sales and handing the retail space over to books. This was followed, after a failed attempt to buy BlinkBox books from Tesco in January 2015, with Waterstones announcing it had sold its ebook business to Rakuten Kobo Inc in May 2016, subsequently directing customers who had purchased eBooks through the retailer to access their ebooks via Kobo's eBook site. This sale represented an exit from the eBook and eReader market for Waterstones after 8 years and multiple platforms.

The company partnered with Oxfam in 2015 to raise £1 million for those impacted by the Syrian civil war crisis through a nationwide campaign called ‘Buy Books for Syria’. Further changes to shops were made in 2015, with the closure of Wimbledon and Birmingham New Street, the opening of The Rye Bookshop and a return to Welwyn Garden City. The company reported an operating income of £5.4 million and a further narrowing of losses to £4.5 million from £18.8 million the previous year.

In a 2016 interview with Daunt, he stated that Amazon "defines how Waterstones acts" and while Waterstones could not compete with the internet retailer digitally, it could offer a credible alternative, believing there was "a future in physical bookselling." Waterstones continued to look at "fixing the basics" during 2016, such as adjusting shop opening hours and harnessing data from the loyalty card as well as refurbishment of physical shops, including the Canterbury branch, and work on its e-commerce routes through improvements to product ranking. Shops in Oxford Street Plaza, Edinburgh George Street, and Reading Oracle were closed, Harpenden Books, Glasgow Fort,  Tottenham Court Road were opened  and Wimbledon and Watford were reopened in new sites. The newly opened shops benefitted from a refreshed brand look, widely welcomed by the book trade. The retailer renewed its partnership with Oxfam to continue to raise money for the Syrian crisis, donating £5 for each ‘Book of the Month’ sold in-shop during November 2016. Daunt made public his concern that the UK EU referendum was likely to impact on company sales due to an expected retail downturn following a ‘no’ vote. He later noted that sales had remained ‘buoyant’ following the decision to leave the EU, but remained pessimistic for the future.

Accounts show that Waterstones made its first profit in 7 years of £11.7 million in the year ending April 2016. This included increased profits in Ireland, with sales rising 7% over the year,  with the company expressing a desire to open more shops in Ireland. The management board was reduced from 7 members to 3 in August 2016, with the departure of Miranda Curtis and a statement that the future composition was under review. Waterstones announced it had raised £300,000 for BookTrust in 3 years since partnering, and would continue the partnership for a fourth year.

In April 2018, hedge fund Elliott Management Corporation bought a majority stake in the company, leaving Alexander Mamut's Lynwood Investments with a minority holding. The sale completed in early June 2018. Daunt remained as chief executive.

In 2021, an article in The Bookseller reported that Waterstones were planning a collaboration with Next to have Waterstones within some Next stores. In April 2022, a new Waterstones within Next in Martlesham, Ipswich was announced 

In 2022, Waterstones purchased Blackwell's, the largest independent bookstore in the UK, for an undisclosed sum. The acquisition was done under US hedge fund Elliott Investment Management.

Acquisitions

Dillons (including Hatchards)
Acquired in 1995 by the Thorn EMI group, Dillons was the UK's second largest bookseller behind Waterstones and was the bookselling arm of EMI's retail division, which included HMV. Dillon's had acquired Hatchards. Following the demerger of Thorn and EMI in 1996, the retail arm was divested from the EMI portfolio within a year and spun off into the HMV Media Group, an investment venture between EMI Group and Advent International private equity group. This venture included HMV, Dillons and Waterstones (the latter bought from WHSmith for £300 million), combining to make an international entertainment retailer of over 500 shops. Following a rebuffed takeover attempt in 1997 of WHSmith, Tim Waterstone became part of the deal and by May 1998, following the £801 million deal completion became chairman of the group. All Dillons shops were incorporated within the Waterstones brand by 1998.

Ottakar's

In September 2005 HMV Group began attempts to buy rival book chain Ottakar's. This alarmed publishers and authors who hoped the Office of Fair Trading would refer the takeover bid to the Competition Commission. In March 2006, the Competition Commission cleared Waterstones for takeover of the Ottakar's, stating the takeover would "not result in a substantial lessening of competition", and is "not likely to affect book prices, range of titles offered or quality of service." Through extensive research they also found that "contrary to widespread perception, Waterstones, like Ottakar's, operates a book-buying system which mixes central and local input on stock selection."

On 31 May 2006, Waterstones announced that it had successfully negotiated the takeover of Ottakar's. HMV chief executive Alan Giles said: "A combined Waterstones and Ottakar's business will create an exciting, quality bookseller, able to respond better to the increasingly competitive pressures of the retail market." Ottakar's chairman Philip Dunne said: "Over the last year the book market has undergone a significant change with new levels of competition from the supermarkets and online retailers impacting all specialist booksellers and in particular those with insufficient scale to compete on equal terms."

Following the takeover, HMV announced that they would be rebranding every branch of Ottakar's as a Waterstones. In July 2006, a conversion programme was initiated and within four months, every Ottakar's shop had been relaunched as a Waterstones and had seen the loss of 100 jobs.

Books Etc

In August 2008, the now defunct Borders chain agreed to sell eight Books Etc. shops to Waterstones for an undisclosed sum. The takeover, which represented 34,000 sq ft of retail space and incurred no staff losses, increased Waterstones' presence within London to almost 50 shops, "crucially [in] areas that are not represented by Waterstones bookshops". The shops, in Fleet Street, London Wall, Holborn, Wandsworth, Uxbridge, Finchley Road, and Canary Wharf, were rebranded and merged into the Waterstones chain by September 2008.

Foyles
In September 2018, Waterstones confirmed it would buy 115-year-old Foyles, with seven stores whilst retaining the brand. James Daunt said the purchase would help "to protect and champion the pleasures of real bookshops in the face of Amazon's siren call".

Blackwell's 
In February 2022, Waterstones acquired Blackwell's for an undisclosed sum.

Controversies

Tax
Tim Waterstone and James Daunt have been critical of tax avoidance by Amazon.com in the British press. Amazon has received sustained scrutiny for the amount of its overall sales that are reported by its UK subsidiary, in comparison to those 'processed offshore in Luxembourg to avoid UK tax'. In the 2012–13 financial year, Amazon paid £3.2 million in tax on sales of £4.2 billion and received £2.5 million in grants from the government. In the same period, it was revealed that Waterstones paid £11.9 million in tax, despite an operating loss of £25.4 million and sales of £410.4 million.

In a report on tax avoidance in the book industry, the magazine Ethical Consumer argued that A&NN Capital Fund Management, Waterstones' parent company in Bermuda, "likely to be for tax avoidance purposes". In response to this, Waterstones issued a clarification on their website reading "As a UK registered and domiciled business, Waterstones fulfils all its tax obligations. This will include both the payment and reporting of all necessary UK taxes, as set out under UK tax legislation." In the 2013–14 financial period, the first full year under A&NN, Waterstones reported sales to Companies House of £398.5 million and an operating loss of £12.2 million.

Non-branded shops

Waterstones opened its first non-branded shop in Southwold, Suffolk in July 2014 called Southwold Books. The company decided not to use its branding as it wished to ‘fit in’ with the town's high proportion of independent retailers, but this move drew anger from local residents at the time as they viewed the move as "dishonest" and said that local shop rents were being increased because of retail chains moving in and this subsequently was "changing the character of the high street".

Non-branded Waterstones became an issue again in 2016 at a national level, following newspaper reports about not only Southwold Books but two further shops, The Rye Bookshop in Sussex and Harpenden Books in Hertfordshire, being opened and local residents not realising the connection with the retailer. Commentators were split on the ethics of the decision to open unbranded shops, but it was noted that at no point had attempts been made to hide the connection to the retailer. In interviews, James Daunt denied any "subterfuge" and said he wanted for the shops to behave as independent retailers do and have their own identity. He further stated that more unbranded shops were likely to open in the future.

Environmental impact
Waterstones has worked with the British Safety Council to consider its environmental impact, including factors beyond its carbon footprint. After a 2008 audit, the Council awarded Waterstones three out of a possible five stars for environmental impact.

Real living wage 
, Waterstones does not pay the "real living wage", as recommended by the Living Wage Foundation, and a rate significantly higher than the official National Living Wage. More than 1,300 writers backed a campaign to ask Waterstones to pay the "real living wage". In response Waterstone managing director James Daunt said the company was "simply not profitable enough" and that "there's a long gap between wanting to do something and it being remotely sensible". Waterstones said that only Ikea, Majestic and Lush of other similar large retailers pay the "real living wage".

Awards

Waterstones maintains and supports various literary awards, including the Waterstones Children's Laureate, the Waterstones Children's Book Prize, the Waterstones Book of the Year, Waterstones Debut Fiction Prize, and the Pushkin House Russian Book Prize as well as now defunct awards including the Waterstones 11 and The Guardian First Book Award. The company has also received various industry and consumer awards.

Waterstones prizes

Book of the Year 

The prize, which has been running since 2012, sees booksellers from across the company select a shortlist of books from any category, published at any time, before the winner is chosen by panel.

Children's Book Prize 

Waterstones continued the Ottakar's Children's Book Prize under its own brand and since 2005, the Waterstone's Children's Book Prize has attempted "to uncover hidden talent in children's writing" by awarding authors with no more than two previously published books (adult or children's fiction).
Waterstones is also the main sponsor of The Waterstones Children's Laureate, previously sponsored by Ottakar's. The 2011–2013 role saw the position carry the Waterstones branding for the first time, with the company stating it was 'up weighting [its] activity' and 'supporting the role in shops and online in different ways throughout the year and beyond.' Holders of the role during sponsorship include Julia Donaldson, Malorie Blackman and the current holder, Chris Riddle.

Debut Fiction Prize
The Waterstones Debut Fiction Prize, established in 2022, is an annual literary award presented to the best debut fiction published in the previous 12 months.

Waterstones 11
Set up in 2011, the Waterstones 11 was created to promote debut literary fiction from new authors being published in the year ahead. Books were chosen from a list of 100 submitted by publishers, and were announced in January 2011 with in-shop and online support, as well as a media campaign for the final 11. The inaugural 11 included the Orange Prize Winner The Tiger's Wife by Téa Obreht, Man Booker Prize nominee Pigeon English, by Stephen Kelman and the Edinburgh International Book Festival First Book Award winner When God Was a Rabbit, by Sarah Winman. The last list was announced in January 2013, following the discontinuation of the prize in January 2014.

Locations

Waterstones has academic and high street shops in Europe including the United Kingdom, Republic of Ireland (with shops in Cork, Drogheda, and in Dublin under the name Hodges Figgis) and in the Netherlands and Belgium. Some branches in the company occupy buildings of architectural and historical interest.

Flagship superstores

Its flagship shop on Piccadilly, formerly the Simpsons of Piccadilly department store and notable for its 1930s-Modernist architecture, is the largest shop in the Waterstones estate and claimed to be the largest bookshop in Europe. The main academic branch, formerly the flagship shop of Dillons, is located on Gower Street, between University College London and the Student Central, and promoted as Europe's largest academic bookshop. Aside from these branches, Waterstones operates a number of large shops which are set over multiple floors. Waterstones refers to these shops as 'superstores':
Piccadilly, London (formerly Simpsons of Piccadilly) – flagship branch with six floors and an estimated  miles of shelving. In 2012, the head office of the company was moved to the shop.
Gower Street, London – academic branch with five floors and 5 miles of shelving
Sidney Street, Cambridge – set over four floors, and containing two cafes. 
Albion Street, Leeds set over three floors
College Lane, Liverpool – two floors, including the largest open-plan floor of books in Europe.
Deansgate, Manchester – three floors, with over 100,000 books in stock.
Milsom Street, Bath – three floors, with over 55,000 books in stock.
La Scala Cinema, Sauchiehall Street, Glasgow – five floors, set in a former cinema
Bridlesmith Gate, Nottingham – four floors, with concessions

Shops of architectural and historical interest

Kalverstraat, Amsterdam, designed by Dutch architect Hendrick Petrus Berlage
Wool Exchange, Bradford
High Street, Birmingham, formerly Times Furniture Company
Dolphin & Anchor, West Street, Chichester,
West End Princes Street, Edinburgh
Corn Exchange, Lincoln,
Emerson Chambers, Newcastle upon Tyne
William Baker House, Cornmarket St, Oxford
Fishergate, Preston, formerly Booths grocery and head office
Broad Street, Reading, formerly Broad Street Independent Chapel
The Tontines Building, Parliament Row, Stoke-on-Trent
The Carlton Cinema, Swansea

See also
Books in the United Kingdom
Hatchards
HMV Group

References

External links

Bookshops of the United Kingdom
Book selling websites
Ebook suppliers
Retail companies of the United Kingdom
Bookstores established in the 20th century
British companies established in 1982
Retail companies established in 1982
1982 establishments in England
British brands
2011 mergers and acquisitions
2018 mergers and acquisitions
Private equity portfolio companies
British booksellers